Gorenja Nemška Vas is a settlement in the Municipality of Trebnje in eastern Slovenia. The area is part of the historical region of Lower Carniola. The municipality is now included in the Southeast Slovenia Statistical Region.

A Roman period burial ground has been identified near the settlement.

References

External links
Gorenja Nemška Vas at Geopedia

Populated places in the Municipality of Trebnje